Eleanor of Alburquerque (1374 – 16 December 1435) was a Castilian noblewoman, Countess of Alburquerque, became who Queen of Aragon by her marriage to Ferdinand I of Aragon.  She was the regent of Aragon during the absence of her son the king in 1420.

Family 
Eleanor was born in Aldeadavila de la Ribera, province of Salamanca. Her father was Sancho Alfonso, 1st Count of Alburquerque, who was an illegitimate son of King Alfonso XI of Castile and his mistress Eleanor of Guzman, and a brother of King Henry II of Castile.  Her mother was Infanta Beatrice, Countess of Alburquerque, who was daughter of Peter I of Portugal and Ines de Castro. Eleanor's brother was Ferdinand, 2nd Count of Alburquerque.

Marriage and queenship
Eleanor was originally betrothed to Frederick, illegitimate son of Henry II of Castile, however this engagement was broken off.

Upon the death of the sickly John I of Castile on October 9 of 1390 the Regency Council addressed the issue of the heir presumptive, Infante Henry at the time eleven years of age and his brother Infante Ferdinand, who was then ten years old. It was agreed that Ferdinand could not marry before his brother Henry reached the age of fourteen. Then he would be granted the privileges and social policies majority.

Peter I of Castile was murdered in March 1369 by his bastard brother Henry. The representatives of the clergy, the nobility, the state of the gentry and merchants, as well as the authorized legal representatives of some Castillian cities agreed that Henry's grandson Infante Henry should marry the granddaughter of the murdered Peter, the English princess Catherine of Lancaster, daughter of John of Gaunt. As the elder brother, Henry, fulfilled these requirements then so should his brother Infante Ferdinand, with a good wife who was honorable and rich.

It was then heard that Eleanor of Alburquerque was sixteen and old enough to marry. She expressed her agreement in marriage but could not take place as Ferdinand was not yet ten years old. She owned the towns of Haro, Briones, Vilforado, Ledesma with the five towns, Albuquerque, the Codesera, Azagala, Alconchel, Medellin, Alconétar and Villalon, a gift from John I of Castile. This made Eleanor a very attractive offer to Ferdinand.

In 1394, Eleanor and Ferdinand were married. The marriage is described as a happy one. In 1412, Ferdinand and Eleanor became King and Queen of Aragon after the Compromise of Caspe. Eleanor was crowned in 1414.

Later life
Ferdinand died in 1416, aged 36 years. Eleanor, who was then 42 years old, retired to Medina del Campo. When her son the king left for Italy in 1420, he appointed her to act as his regent during his absence. 

The Royal Palace of Medina del Campo, birthplace of her husband and her children, was transformed into the Convent of Santa María la Real. There, Eleanor witnessed her children fighting against the royalist party led by Álvaro de Luna. Eleanor lost some of her possessions as a benefit for the latter. 

In 1435 her sons, the princes of Aragon were taken prisoners of the Genoese after the naval battle of Ponza. 

Eleanor died in Medina del Campo, province of Valladolid, in 1435. Her grave is in the Convent of Santa María la Real, in a simple grave on the floor. It has a tablet that is stone Toledo dark, with the Royal Arms carved on it.

Issue
She had seven children:
 Alfonso V of Aragon (1394–1458), also king of Sicily and Naples
 Maria of Aragon, first wife of John II of Castile, (1396–1445)
 John II of Aragon (1397–1479)
 Henry of Aragon, Duke of Villena, Count of Alburquerque, Count of Empuries and Grand Master of the Order of Santiago (1400–1445)
 Eleanor of Aragon (Queen of Portugal), who married Edward I of Portugal, (1402–1445)
 Pedro of Aragon, Count of Alburquerque and Duke of Noto (1406–1438)
 Sancho of Aragon (1410–March 1416). Created Grand Master of the Orders of Calatrava and Alcántara after 1412.

Ancestors

References

Sources

 https://web.archive.org/web/20110707104223/http://www.aldeadavila.com/historia/la-historia-de-leonor-de-alburquerque-y-ledesma/

|-

1374 births
1435 deaths
House of Trastámara
Aragonese queen consorts
Countesses of Barcelona
Majorcan queens consort
Royal consorts of Sicily
Burials at the Poblet Monastery
14th-century Castilians
14th-century Spanish women
14th-century Italian nobility
14th-century Italian women 
15th-century people from the Kingdom of Aragon
15th-century Spanish women
15th-century Italian nobility
15th-century Italian women
15th-century women rulers
Queen mothers